Protancylis bisecta is a species of moth of the family Tortricidae. It is found in Cameroon.

The wingspan is about 14 mm. The ground colour of the forewings is creamy up to the median fascia and mixed ferruginous distally. The strigulation (fine streaks) and suffusions are brown and the costa is darker. The hindwings are brownish grey.

References

	

Endemic fauna of Cameroon
Moths described in 2002
Enarmoniini